John Randall  "Randy"  Flanagan  (born 8 January 1960) is a Canadian neuroscientist, who has made important contributions to the neuroscience of sensorimotor control. From 2006 he has been  a Professor of Psychology at  Queen's University.

Education

Flanagan completed a B.P.E. in  Physical Education at the  University of Alberta  in 1983 and an MA in Physical Education at  McGill University, where he also completed a PhD in Psychology in 1992 with David Ostry.

Career
Flanagan pursued psychology as a postdoctoral researcher (1992–1994) at the  MRC Applied Psychology Unit in Cambridge with Alan Wing. He then joined  the faculty of  Teachers College, Columbia University in 1994 before moving to the Department of Psychology at  Queen's University in 1995.

References

External links
 Neurotree
 CV Queen's University

1960 births
Living people
Canadian neuroscientists
Teachers College, Columbia University faculty
University of Alberta alumni
McGill University Faculty of Education alumni